Timothy Dennis Awany (born 6 August 1996) is a Ugandan professional footballer who plays for F.C. Ashdod and the Uganda national team as a defender.

Club career
Awany played for Kampala Capital City Authority.

In July 2019, he joined Israeli Premier League side F.C. Ashdod.

International career
Awany made his international debut with the Uganda national team in 2016, and was named in the squad for the 2017 Africa Cup of Nations.

Career statistics

References

External links
 

1996 births
Living people
Sportspeople from Kampala
Ugandan footballers
Association football defenders
Uganda international footballers
2017 Africa Cup of Nations players
2019 Africa Cup of Nations players
Israeli Premier League players
Kampala Capital City Authority FC players
F.C. Ashdod players
Ugandan expatriate footballers
Ugandan expatriate sportspeople in Israel
Expatriate footballers in Israel
Uganda A' international footballers
2016 African Nations Championship players
2018 African Nations Championship players